Vũ Nguyễn Hà Anh (born 10 April 1982) is a Vietnamese model. She has also competed in some beauty contests at home and abroad, including Miss Universe Vietnam and Miss Earth. She was invited to be the main judge of Vietnam's Next Top Model 2010 season, and in 2011 launched a singing career but achieved very limited success; she has released three singles. In 2022, she was crowned Miss Debate with Navote, when Đoàn Thiên Ân was body shamed by Navote.

Early life and education
Hà Anh was born on 10 April 1982 by her mother Lệ Hà, a journalist. She has a younger sister Hà Mi born seven years later and a similar-aged cousin named Đốm. When she was nine, her grandmother gave her Michael Jackson's album Dangerous, sparking her a love for music. She studied at Hanoi – Amsterdam High School in Vietnam and abroad at Broomsgrove School in England. During her freshman year at the University of Reading, she was persuaded by her employer and mother to pursue becoming a fashion model.

In October 2022, she requested to join her anticlub “Vạch Trần Siêu Nổ Ha Anh Vu” but has never got approved.

Career

Beauty contests
She represented Vietnam at Miss Earth 2006 in the Philippines. In May 2008, she participated in the first Miss Universe Vietnam. She continued to participated in various contests.

Musical 
Her first public appearance as a singer was at Miss Earth 2006. On 28 November 2011, her first single was released as a DVD at Harper's Bazaar magazine. Her music video, Model (Take My Picture), is criticized for being provocative and low quality. Three days later, Hà Anh promoted herself in a minishow called It's Me, Hà Anh at the Park Hyatt Hotel. On 6 April 2012, Hà Anh held a second mini-show in Hanoi entitled From the Very Start, to release her eponymous second single. Her third single, "Put It on Me", was released in 2014 in a video co-starring the Hollywood actor Robert Parks-Valletta.

Television
In 2010, Hà Anh, Huy Võ and Đức Hải were invited to replace the judges for the first season of Vietnam's Next Top Model. After the contest, Huy Võ and Hà Anh, assisted the winner, Huyền Trang, in establishing a business in New York.

After second season winner, Hoàng Thùy, and the first season runner-up, Tuyết Lan, attended the 2012 New York Fashion Week by invitation, Hà Anh said that while Huyền Trang had multiple appearances in fashion shows, Tuyết Lan and Hoàng Thùy had only performed at Couture Fashion Week, which took place at the same time. Quỳnh Trang, the production manager of Vietnam's Next Top Model, and designer Đỗ Mạnh Cường responded angrily to her criticism of Vietnam's Next Top Model, and Tuyết Lan said that Hà Anh had been rude and an unfair judge.

Discography

References

1982 births
Living people
People from Hanoi
Vietnamese female models
Miss Earth 2006 contestants
21st-century Vietnamese women